John Ørsted Hansen (born 8 October 1938) is a retired Danish rower. Together with Erik Petersen, Kurt Helmudt and Bjørn Hasløv he won the gold medal at the 1964 Summer Olympics and a silver medal at the 1964 European Championships in the coxless fours event.

References

1938 births
Living people
Danish male rowers
Olympic rowers of Denmark
Rowers at the 1964 Summer Olympics
Olympic gold medalists for Denmark
Olympic medalists in rowing
Medalists at the 1964 Summer Olympics
European Rowing Championships medalists
Rowers from Copenhagen